Adichapuram  is a village in the Mannargudi taluk of Tiruvarur district in Tamil Nadu, India.

Demographics 

As per the 2001 census, Adichapuram had a population of 2110 with 1,031 males and 1,079 females. The sex ratio was 1047. The literacy rate was 70

References 

 

Villages in Tiruvarur district